Abu Dhabi International Private School (Arabic: مدرسة أبو ظبي الدولية الخاصة‎, romanized: Madrasaẗ Ābu Ẓabi Al-Dawliyyah Al-H̱aṣa) (usually shortened to Abu Dhabi International (Pvt.) School, Abu Dhabi International School, or just AIS) is a private international school licensed by the Ministry of Education located in Abu Dhabi in the United Arab Emirates. The school offers an American curriculum, as well as the International General Certificate of Secondary Education (IGCSE) and the International Baccalaureate (IB) programs. It was founded in 1992 by current superintendent, Jihan Nasr.

Campuses 
The school currently has two running campuses. The first campus was opened in 1992. It is located on the main island of the emirate of Abu Dhabi on Al Karamah Street. The school facilities include a library, a football field, a prayer room, a gymnasium, four laboratories, an art room, and a music room. The campus contains 1,402 students and 95 staff members. The newer campus in the Mohammed Bin Zayed City region of Abu Dhabi was opened in 2016. It contains 2,616 students and 183 staff members. As of now, the IGCSE curriculum is being offered in the first campus, while the campus in the Mohammed Bin Zayed City offers the American and IB programs.

Accreditation 
Abu Dhabi International School was accredited by the Commissions on International and Trans-Regional Accreditation (CITA), and is currently accredited by the American International Accreditation Association (AIAA). The school was certified by the International Baccalaureate to offer the IB Diploma Programme to students in 11th and 12th grade in 2005. Its Mohammed Bin Zayed campus has been licensed in 2015.

Students and staff 
The school offers its educational services to a total of 4,018 students and jobs to a total of 275 staff members. Their students and staff members are from over 60 nationalities. The school is coeducational throughout all grade levels.

Curriculum 
Abu Dhabi International School provides its students with three curricula: the American curriculum, the International General Certificate of Secondary Education (IGCSE) curriculum, and the International Baccalaureate (IB) curriculum. Students in the school from kindergarten up until the 9th grade follow the American curriculum. High school students choose between the American high school diploma, IGCSE program, or the IB Diploma Programme.

Fees 
The tuition fees (2022/2023) at Abu Dhabi International School can be paid in three installments:

 The first fees are paid at the time of registration and must be cleared before August
 The second fees must be submitted by a post-dated check dated in December or before
 The third fees must be submitted by a post-dated check dated in March or before

Payments can be made by cash or check installments or by credit cards in full. Based on the ADEK rules and regulations, refunds will be given if a student has to leave the school before the end of the academic year.

The tuition fees for the Mohammed Bin Zayed City campus for the academic year 2022-2023 are as follows:

All these figures are in the United Arab Emirates Dirham (AED). The tuition fees do not include the cost of books and uniforms. The bus transportation cost is AED 4,500.

Clubs and activities 
The schools have an extra-curricular program which provides a variety of clubs that meet the needs and interest of the students. The purpose of these clubs is to teach the students new skills and techniques and to improve on their existing skills and techniques. These clubs include the football club, basketball club, art club, photography club, and the debate & public speaking club. The school has men and women senior and junior varsity teams for football, basketball, and volleyball, and has participated in many school tournaments around the country.

Affiliations 
The school works together with many companies and organizations for the benefit of the students. It uses the surrounding community to enrich the experiences of their students. Some of the school's affiliations are listed below:
 Model United Nations
 Shaikh Khalifa Medical City
 Terry Fox Organization
 Sheraton Hotels and Resorts
 Abu Dhabi Film Festival
 Yas Waterworld Abu Dhabi
 Abu Dhabi Golf Championship

and many more.

ADEK inspection report 
Both campuses were given a "Very Good" rating by the Abu Dhabi Department of Education and Knowledge which makes them both "Band A" schools.

References 

International schools in Abu Dhabi
Private schools in the United Arab Emirates
American international schools in the United Arab Emirates
Schools in the Emirate of Abu Dhabi